Lynx is the name of three fictional characters appearing in DC Comics.

Fictional character biographies

Dome's Henchman
The first Lynx is a henchman of Doctor Dome, a Plastic Man villain.

Ghost Dragons

Lynx was originally seen as the girlfriend of Billy Hue, leader of the Parisian branch of the Ghost Dragons, a Chinese youth gang with members from Macau, Kowloon, and Hong Kong that served the ruthless King Snake. King Snake, known to the public at large as Sir Edmund Dorrance, was a British businessman and criminal. Robin (Tim Drake) met her in Paris and was dazzled by her beauty. Billy Hue later failed to kill Clyde Rawlins, an American interfering in King Snake’s affairs, due to Robin's interference. Hue was killed by King Snake as punishment, and Ling was dubbed Lynx and given leadership of the Ghost Dragons in his place. When Lynx failed to kill Robin and prevent him from interfering in King Snake's plans, his warped sense of good manners prevented him from killing her, although he still felt he could punish her in another way. King Snake moved the Ghost Dragons to Gotham, and Robin discovered one of her eyes had been put out by King Snake. She felt this mutilation to be Robin’s fault, and swore revenge.

The Ghost Dragons gradually began carving a "turf" in Gotham, with Lynx at their head and King Snake working from the shadows, badly wounded after his first encounter with Robin. Lynx still served King Snake, and clashed with Robin on several occasions. She was part of a Gotham gang war between the Ghost Dragons and the Russian Odessa, leading her into conflict with both Robin, and the Huntress. Eventually, she came to hate the idea that the Ghost Dragons were led by a white man, and after King Snake killed a member of the Triads (an act she considered highly foolish) she led a revolt against him.  King Snake was arrested, and Lynx became sole leader of the Ghost Dragons. She attempted to expand the gang's territory, into the Gotham suburbs, but was stopped by Robin and Spoiler.

Subsequently, she spent time as a mercenary, but eventually returned to Gotham and resumed control of the Ghost Dragons. When Gotham was declared a No Man’s Land the Ghost Dragons controlled a part of the city, and they held it for much of the No Man's Land period. Eventually, Lynx was approached by Batman, who recruited her in stopping a man who selling Gotham children as slaves.  The alliance did not continue afterwards, and once Gotham was reopened, Lynx returned to her criminal life.

During the "War Crimes" story arc, Lynx attempted to expand Ghost Dragon territory, and came into conflict with Batgirl (Cassandra Cain). When Lynx proved unable to best Batgirl in combat, one of her Ghost Dragon gang members attempted to interfere in the fight, accidentally killing her as she struggled with Batgirl.

During the "One Year Later" storyline, she had returned from the dead, having been brought back by League of Assassin Mystics, only to be killed again by Batgirl immediately after. Lynx's corpse was put into a Batgirl costume, and Robin was framed by Batgirl for the murder. Robin set off to prove his innocence, and that the girl in the costume was not the real Batgirl. In the end, he was successful.

Third Lynx

Preview solicitations for Robin #179 show a new Lynx in a cat-like costume.

In the "Battle For The Cowl" storyline, a new Lynx is recruited by Black Mask to be part of a group of villains that aim to take over Gotham. She is seen fighting with Man-Bat against gang members in Battle for the Cowl #1, and is also seen with all the Gotham Heroes in the third issue.

She later appears in Red Robin. After being captured and unmasked by Red Robin, Lynx reveals that she is a teenager and claims to be an undercover officer from Hong Kong. After receiving intel from Cassandra Cain that indicates that the Hong Kong Police Department is indeed using teenagers for undercover operations, Red Robin frees Lynx from prison. Just before departing into the night, Lynx kisses Red Robin, which causes him to realize that there is an attraction between them.

Powers and abilities 
Lynx is a master of martial arts and trained in the use of guns and hand-to-hand weapons.

See also
List of Batman Family enemies

References

DC Comics martial artists
Fictional drug dealers
Fictional mercenaries in comics
DC Comics supervillains
Comics characters introduced in 1991
Comics characters introduced in 2009
Characters created by Chuck Dixon
Batman characters

de:Robin (Batman)#Lynx